{{Infobox person
|name        = Peter Lepeniotis
|image       =
|caption     =
|birth_name  = 
|birth_date  =
|birth_place = Canada
|nationality = 
|occupation  = Animator, film director, screenwriter, producer, storyboard artist
|years_active = 1995–present
|known for   = Toy Story 2Surly SquirrelThe Nut Job
}}

Peter Lepeniotis is a Canadian animator, film director, screenwriter and producer. He is best known for his 2005 animated short Surly Squirrel. He adapted the short into the full-length feature film, The Nut Job, which Lepeniotis co-wrote and directed. It was released in 2014 by Open Road Films and The Weinstein Company. Due to the film's success at the box office, Lepeniotis and the team at ToonBox Entertainment (the studio that produced Lepeniotis' feature film) greenlit a sequel, The Nut Job 2: Nutty by Nature, which was released in 2017.

Filmography
 Casper (1995) (animator)
 Toy Story 2 (1999) (animator)
 Fantasia 2000 (1999) (assistant animator)
 Dinosaur (2000) (animator)
 Bless the Child (2000) (visual effects animator)
 Bait (2000) (animator)
 3-2-1 Penguins! (2002-2003) (animator)
 Surly Squirrel (2005, short film) (director, producer, and writer)
 Everyone's Hero (2006) (supervising animator)
 Gotta Catch Santa Claus (2008) (director)
 Bolts and Blip (2010, TV) (director)
 Nuts And Robbers (2011, Short Film) (director, story, and storyboard artist)
 The Nut Job (2014) (director, co-writer, story, Adaptation from Short Film Surly Squirrel)
 The Nut Job 2: Nutty by Nature (2017) (based on characters by, Executive Producer; uncredited)
 Gnome Alone (2018) (director)
 PAW Patrol: The Movie (2021) (additional animator; uncredited)
 Jill and Evan's Amazing Jungle Adventure (TBA) (director, co-writer)
 War of their Worlds'' (TBA) (director)

References

External links
 

Living people
Canadian animated film directors
Canadian animated film producers
Year of birth missing (living people)
The Nut Job